Ely Jair Esterilla Castro (born 6 February 1993) is an Ecuadorian professional footballer who plays as a forward for 9 de Octubre.

Club career

Rocafuerte
Born in Guayaquil, Esterilla joined Rocafuerte's youth setup in 2005. He made his first team debut in the 2010 campaign, in Serie B.

Santos Laguna
On 3 June 2012, Esterilla moved abroad and joined Liga MX side Santos Laguna, being assigned to the under-20 squad. He never appeared with the main squad during his spell, but won the 2013 Clausura tournament with the under-20s.

Barcelona SC
On 19 December 2013, Esterilla returned to his home country and joined Barcelona on a four-year contract. He made his professional debut the following 29 January, coming on as a second-half substitute for Federico Laurito in a 1–0 Serie A home win against Manta.

Esterilla scored his first professional goal on 13 April 2014, netting his team's second in a 2–0 home defeat of Independiente del Valle. On 27 March 2016, he scored a brace in a 5–0 home routing of L.D.U. Quito.

International career
Esterilla represented Ecuador at under-20 level, playing in the 2013 South American Youth Football Championship. On 2 October 2015, he was called up by the full side for two 2018 FIFA World Cup qualifiers against Uruguay and Venezuela, but withdrew due to injury three days later.

Career statistics

References

External links
Ely Esterilla profile at Federación Ecuatoriana de Fútbol 

1993 births
Living people
Sportspeople from Guayaquil
Ecuadorian footballers
Association football forwards
Ecuadorian Serie A players
Ecuadorian Serie B players
Barcelona S.C. footballers
Ecuador under-20 international footballers